Aşağı Çardaqlar (also, Aşağı Çardaxlar, Ashaga Chardakhly, Ashagy Chardakhlar, Ashagy-Chardakhar, and Chordakhly) is a village and municipality in the Zaqatala Rayon of Azerbaijan. It has a population of 1,045.

References 

Populated places in Zaqatala District